Gummadidala is a mandal in Sangareddy district of Telangana, India.

References

Villages in Sangareddy district